Ronald Allen Harris (February 8, 1947 – December 31, 1980) was an American boxer who competed at the 1964 Olympic Games in Tokyo.

Harris was born in Detroit, Michigan, where he attended Chadsey High School.

Amateur career
Harris won the National AAU Lightweight title in 1964, earning him an Olympic team birth.  Boxing at 132 pounds, Harris captured the bronze medal at the 1964 Tokyo Olympiad.

1964 Olympic results
 Round of 64: bye
 Round of 32: Defeated Fawzi Hassan (United Arab Republic/Egypt) KO
 Round of 16: Defeated Kanemaru Shiratori (Japan) 5-0
 Quarterfinal: Defeated Rodolfo Arpon (Philippines) 5-0
 Semifinal: Lost to Jozef Grudzien (Poland) 1-4 (was awarded bronze medal)

Professional career
Harris turned professional in 1965 and won his first 19 fights before he lost a decision to Shinichi Kadota.  He retired in 1973, having never fought for a world title.

1973-09-22 Arturo Zuniga Toronto, ON, Canada L PTS 10

1973-08-20 Peter Cobblah Las Vegas, NV, USA W PTS 10

1973-07-10 Horacio Agustin Saldano Buenos Aires, Argentina L PTS 10

1973-04-29 Bobby Hayman Detroit, MI, USA W PTS 10

1972-08-21 Alvin Phillips New Orleans, LA, USA L PTS 10

1972-07-22 Papo Villa Detroit, MI, USA W PTS 10

1972-03-25 Raul Soriano Detroit, MI, USA W PTS 10

1972-01-14 Percy Pugh Detroit, MI, USA W UD 10

1971-10-29 Don Cobbs Detroit, MI, USA W KO 3

1969-06-12 Shinichi Kadota Los Angeles, CA, USA L SD 10

1969-04-18 Frank Steele Detroit, MI, USA W PTS 12

1969-04-10 Manuel Lugo Los Angeles, CA, USA W PTS 6

1969-02-14 Jesus Alicia Indianapolis, IN, USA W KO 3

1968-12-04 Arnold Bushman (Bush) Indianapolis, IN, USA W KO 2

1968-11-26 Frank Steele Detroit, MI, USA W PTS 8

1968-07-24 Brad Silas Detroit, MI, USA W PTS 10

1968-07-18 Pulga Serrano Los Angeles, CA, USA W UD 10

1968-06-28 Primus Williams Akron, OH, USA W PTS 6

1968-06-21 Primus Williams Buffalo, NY, USA W PTS 6

1967-08-24 Rudy Richardson Detroit, MI, USA W PTS 6

1967-05-06 Clyde Tyler Huntington, WV, USA W PTS 8

1967-04-03 Roger Evans Baltimore, MD, USA W PTS 6

1967-03-27 Howard Moore Norfolk, VA, USA W PTS 6

1966-11-21 Larry Youngblood Detroit, MI, USA W KO 1

1966-11-16 Larry Youngblood Canton, OH, USA W PTS 6

1966-08-29 Rudy Richardson Detroit, MI, USA W PTS 6

1966-04-02 Al Massey Baltimore, MD, USA W PTS 6

1966-03-04 Billy Lloyd Baltimore, MD, USA D PTS 6

1965-05-07 Willie Cooper Wheeling, WV, USA W KO 6

Record to date:
Won 24 (KOs 5) Lost 4 Drawn 1 Total 29

References
 

1947 births
1980 deaths
Boxers at the 1964 Summer Olympics
Olympic bronze medalists for the United States in boxing
Boxers from Detroit
American male boxers
Medalists at the 1964 Summer Olympics
Lightweight boxers